Karen Duve (born 16 November 1961 in Hamburg) is a German author. After secondary school, she worked as a proof-reader and taxi driver in Hamburg. Since 1990 she has been a freelance writer.

Bibliography 
Im tiefen Schnee ein stilles Heim, short stories, Achilla Presse 1995, 
Bruno Orso fliegt ins Weltall, (with Judith Zaugg), comic, Maro Verlag 1997, 
Lexikon berühmter Tiere, (with Thies Völker), Eichborn 1997, 
Keine Ahnung: Erzählungen, Suhrkamp 1999, 
Lexikon berühmter Pflanzen, (with Thies Völker), List TB 1999, 
Regenroman,  Ullstein 1999,  (English translation entitled Rain)
Weihnachten mit Thomas Müller, Eichborn 2003, 
Dies ist kein Liebeslied, 2004,  (English translation entitled This Is Not a Love Song)
Weihnachten mit Thomas Müller. Illustrations by Petra Kolitsch, Eichborn Verlag, Frankfurt am Main 2003, 
Die entführte Prinzessin. Von Drachen, Liebe und anderen Ungeheuern. Novel. Eichborn Verlag, Frankfurt am Main 2005 (paperback 2007)
Thomas Müller und der Zirkusbär. Illustrations by Petra Kolitsch. Eichborn Verlag, Frankfurt am Main 2006, 
Taxi. Roman. Eichborn Verlag, Frankfurt am Main 2008, 
Anständig essen. Ein Selbstversuch. Galiani Verlag, Berlin 2011,  (English translation entitled Eating Decently)
Grrrimm. Galiani Verlag, Berlin 2012, 
Warum die Sache schiefgeht: Wie Egoisten, Hohlköpfe und Psychopathen uns um die Zukunft bringen (Essay), Galiani Verlag, Berlin 2014, 
Macht. Novel. Galiani Verlag, Berlin 2016, .
The Prepper Room. Novel. Dedalus Books 2018, translation: Mike Mitchell, 
 Fräulein Nettes kurzer Sommer. Roman. Galiani, Berlin 2018, .

Awards 
 1991: Preis für junge Prosa der Stadt Arnsberg
 1994: Open Mike-Literaturpreis der literaturWERKstatt Pankow
 1995: Bettina-von-Arnim-Preis
 1996: Gratwanderpreis
 2001: Literatur-Förderpreis Hamburg
 2004: 
 2008:  der Stadt Hamburg
 2011: Nominierung für den Preis der Leipziger Buchmesse mit Anständig essen
 2017: Kasseler Literaturpreis für grotesken Humor

Literatur 
 Lyn Marven, Stuart Taberner: Emerging German-Language Novelists of the Twenty-First Century Camden House, 2011
 The novel in German since 1990 Cambridge Univ. Press, 2011

External links 
 

1961 births
Living people
Writers from Hamburg
German women short story writers
21st-century German novelists
German fantasy writers
German women novelists
Women science fiction and fantasy writers
21st-century German women writers
21st-century German short story writers